Ella Clark (born 8 February 1992) is a British female professional basketball and netball player.

Early life
Clark is from a well-known British basketball family, her father Mark coached the GB national women's team from 2006 to 2009 and her mother played for the National team. Her brother Daniel Clark is also an international basketball player. Clark attended Chingford Foundation School.

Netball career

Clark returned to professional netball in 2016 after having represented England at the under-21 World Championships in 2008 and 2009. She has played for Loughborough Lightning in the Netball Superleague since 2018 and won her first Superleague title with them in June 2021.

References

External links
Profile at eurobasket.com

1992 births
Living people
Basketball players from Greater London
British women's basketball players
Small forwards
Power forwards (basketball)
Loughborough Lightning netball players
English netball players
Mavericks netball players